Van der Hart is a surname. Notable people with the surname include:

Abraham van der Hart (1747/1757–1820), Dutch architect
Cor van der Hart (1928–2006), Dutch footballer
Mickey van der Hart (born 1994), Dutch footballer
Onno van der Hart (born 1941), psychologist, adult psychotherapist, trained family therapist and researcher

Surnames of Dutch origin